This is a list of episodes for the anime adaptations in the Sakura Wars franchise.

Ouka Kenran

4 OVAs produced from 1997 to 1998

Gouka Kenran

6 OVAs produced from December 1999 to December 2000, sequel to Ouka

Katsudou Shashin

A film produced in 2001, sequel to Gouka

Sumire
1 OVA produced in 2002, sequel to Katsudou Shashin

Ecole de Paris
3 OVAs produced in 2003, sequel to Gouka
 夜明けの花
 黒猫と悪女
 恋する都市（まち）

Le Nouveau Paris
3 OVAs produced in 2004, sequel to Ecole
 一夜限りのサーカス
 メル・シー・スパイ
 雷の尖塔（いかずちのせんとう）

New York NY.
6 OVAs produced in 2007, spinoff of Ouka
 ミー＆マイガール
 X…and The City
 星の輝く夜に
 マザー、アイウォントゥシング！
 禁断の楽園
 紐育（ここ）より永遠（とわ）に

Original television series

Sakura Wars the Animation

References

Sakura Wars
Sakura Wars